Ruslan Yakubovich Dzhamalutdinov (born 1 February 1996) is a Russian football player.

Club career
He made his debut for the main squad of FC Kuban Krasnodar on 23 September 2015 in a Russian Cup game against FC Shinnik Yaroslavl.

References

External links
 

1996 births
People from Krasnodar Krai
Living people
Russian footballers
Association football defenders
FC Kuban Krasnodar players
FC Chernomorets Novorossiysk players
FC Veles Moscow players
Sportspeople from Krasnodar Krai